The 2019 Pan American Games torch relay is a 23-day torch run, occurring from July 4 to July 26, 2019, being held prior to the start of the Games. The relay brought the torch from Machu Picchu to the Pan American Ceremonies Venue for the opening ceremony after a lighting ceremony at the Pyramid of the Sun in Teotihuacan, Mexico on 2 July 2019.

Route

References

External links
 Torch relay

2019 Pan American Games
Pan American Games torch relays